The Zona Rosa attack was a guerrilla attack that took place in the Zona Rosa restaurant area of San Salvador, El Salvador at approximately 21:30 on June 19, 1985, during the Salvadoran Civil War. The attack was conducted by gunmen dressed as Salvadoran soldiers, and in total twelve people were killed: four United States Marines, two United States businessmen, a Guatemalan, a Chilean, and four Salvadorans. A left-wing guerrilla group, the Revolutionary Party of Central American Workers, and its armed wing, the Mardoqueo Cruz Urban Commando claimed responsibility for the attack.

In July 1985, as part of the Combat Terrorism Act, the United States offered a reward of US$100,000 for information leading to the conviction of the attackers. By September 1985, the Salvadoran government had arrested four men; one of them was Américo Mauro Araujo, a high-ranking Salvadoran Communist Party official. Seven others who were involved in the attack, however, were never apprehended.

See also
El Mozote massacre
Albert Schaufelberger

References

External links
http://www.usdoj.gov/oig/special/9609/zr1.htm
http://www.usdoj.gov/oig/special/9609/zr5.htm 
http://www.defenselink.mil/releases/release.aspx?releaseid=1130
 https://web.archive.org/web/20080110052757/http://www.usip.org/library/tc/doc/reports/el_salvador/tc_es_03151993_casesE2ab.html

1980s murders in El Salvador
1985 crimes in El Salvador
1985 murders in North America
20th century in San Salvador
Attacks on restaurants in North America
Communist terrorism
Crime in San Salvador
June 1985 events in North America
Mass murder in 1985
Massacres in El Salvador
Salvadoran Civil War
Terrorist incidents in El Salvador
Terrorist incidents in North America in 1985